Canon Andrew Konstanty Glazewski (1905 – 6 November 1973) was a Polish Catholic priest, lecturer in spirituality, healer and researcher into dowsing, the Earth's magnetic field, and paranormal phenomena. He settled in Britain in 1947 after serving as chaplain to the Polish forces during World War II. From 1948 until his death he served as parish priest at Ilford Park, a settlement of Polish exiles in South Devon. His published papers examine the nature of gravity, the human field, the Earth's magnetism, the mechanics of prayer and the theory and the practice of healing. A close associate of Sir George Trevelyan, he was a co-founder of the Scientific and Medical Network.

Early life and education 

Glazewski was born in the family home on the banks of the Dniestr, close to the Ukrainian village of Chmielowa. The family were landed gentry, regarded themselves as Polish, though Poland did not exist as a political entity. In 1915 the family moved to Lviv. He enrolled in Lviv University to study law. However, in 1924 he received his vocation to the priesthood. At first he joined the Dominican order but, finding that the discipline was too austere, he entered a secular novitiate in Lviv. He was ordained in 1931, subsequently studied Theology at Angelicum University in Rome. In 1938 he returned to Poland and was assigned a small parish near Chmielowa. Following the outbreak of World War II, he escaped through Romania to Rome, and then came to Britain in 1940. He served as army chaplain to the Polish forces, and attained the rank of captain. Following D-Day, he was assigned as chaplain to the 10th Mounted Rifles Regiment and sent to Europe. He was wounded twice, later received the Polish Cross of Valour and the Silver Cross of Merit with Swords. Returning to England he served as chaplain to a large community of Polish exiles housed in army barracks near Newton Abbot, Devon --- a position he held until his death.

Work with Jan Rosen 

While at Lviv University (1923-1925) Andrew Glazewski worked closely with the artist Jan Henryk de Rosen who was commissioned to paint the interior of the Armenian Cathedral in Lviv. Rosen used Glazewski as a model for Saint Andrew in his fresco "The Founding of the Blessed Sacrament", and as Saint Stephen. Later while attending the Lviv Seminary Glazewski founded a youth movement "Odrodzenie" whose goal was a renewal of Catholic faith that met frequently in the Cathedral. Around 1931  Rosen painted Glazewski as the priest Ignacy Skorupca in his fresco "The Miracle at the Vistula" in the Pope's private chapel at Castello Gandolfo.

Scientific Interests 

Along with his theological studies, Glazewski studied physics and became conversant with the latest discoveries in Relativity and Quantum Mechanics. After discovering that he could use his hands to heal, sometimes over large distances, he set about formulating a field theory to explain how it worked. In "The Gravitational Wave"  he speculates that gravity contains a scalar field analogous to sound. "The Music of Crystals, Plants and Human Beings" built on the works of J.C. Bose, Alexander Gurwitsch and Gustaf Stromberg. It explores the role of sound and musical harmonics in the development and form of crystals, plants and animals. The paper shows how he tested many of his theories in his laboratory. "A New Suspension of the Magnetic Needle" describes a detector he built to measure the Earth's vertical current, and data he gathered using this detector. He also develops his hypothesis that a bar magnet has additional poles, East-West poles. Throughout his life he taught the Psycho-Physical Healing technique that he had developed,  a precursor to non-contact healing methods such as Therapeutic Touch.He explained the physics behind the healing technique in his paper to the London Hospital Gazette.

Spiritual and pastoral work 
Glazewski was in strong demand as a retreat leader in Polish communities such as the boys' school, Divine Mercy College and parishes in London.  He held annual camps for young people of his parish on St. Mary's (Isles of Scilly). He was recognized for his healing work and for his spiritual teaching, both in his parish and among English speaking congregations. He drew on the psychological works of Carl Jung, Dionysius the Areopagite and the musicologist, Hans Kayser. An admirer of Thomas Aquinas's theology, he translated part of the Summa Theologica into Polish. He taught contemplative prayer and meditation, emphasizing God as a field that permeates all of nature. In 1965 Sir George Trevelyan invited Glazewski to lecture at the adult education center at Attingham Park in Shropshire on psychology and healing. He taught there regularly until the Center's closure in 1971.

Glazewski often spoke about founding a university that would study issues at the boundary of spirituality and medicine. In 1973, he contacted George Blaker and Dr Patrick Shackleton, Dean of Postgraduate Medical Studies at the University of Southampton, and suggested that they collaborate to found such a center. They subsequently established the Scientific and Medical Network.

He died of a heart attack while participating at a workshop  at Hawkwood College near Stroud, November 6, 1973. His body rests in Newton Abbot cemetery.

Bibliography

"The Gravitational Wave,", Proceedings of the Scientific and Technical Congress of Radionics and Radiesthesia, London, May, 1950.

"The Music of Crystals, Plants and Human Beings" , Radio Perception, September 1951

"A New Suspension of the Magnetic Needle", Radio Perception Vol XI, 80, June 1953

"Can there be any science behind Healing Hands?" 
The London Hospital Gazette, March 1967.

"Milosc" from the "Summa Teologica" by St. Thomas Aquinas, translated into Polish with notes by Andrew Glazewski. Publ. Veritas, 1967

"The Human Field in Medical Problems", Psionic Medicine, 1970

"The Pattern of Telepathic Communication", The Radionic Association, 1974.

"The Mechanics of Prayer", The Wrekin Trust, 1974

Harmony of the Universe A compilation of talks and writings, with biography and personal memories by Paul Kieniewicz, White Crow Books, 2014, 

Audio Lectures by Canon Andrew Glazewski

The Mechanics of Prayer, 1965
   
The Science Behind Healing, 1968

Angels, 1968

References

1905 births
1973 deaths
20th-century Polish Roman Catholic priests
Polish psychics